General elections was held in Oman on 15 October 2011 to choose 84-members of the Consultative Assembly.

Background

Following the self-immolation of Mohammed Bouazizi in Tunisia and the consequent 2010-2011 Tunisian uprising, protests around the Arab world for some form of democratic reforms. The Omani protests were crushed by the regime, although reforms were offered.

Sultan Qaboos bin Said then said that the Shura Council would get some legislative powers, while he also promised the initiation of programmes to create more jobs and to fight corruption.

Voting registration
Following the protests, about 520,000 people registered for the election, which saw an increase of 388,000 from 2007.

Candidates
According to the Oman News Agency, there were 1,300 candidates, 77 of whom were women, more than any previous election.

Campaign
According to Al Jazeera voters sought an increase in salaries, more jobs and ending graft as part of a campaign against corruption.

Election
Voting districts that have a population of 30,000 or more choose two MPs, while others have one MP. There were 105 polling stations. The voter turnout was 76%.

References

2011
2011 elections in Asia
2011 in Oman